Love 65 is a 1965 Swedish drama film directed by Bo Widerberg. It was entered into the 15th Berlin International Film Festival. Bill Evans' "Peace Piece" featured in the soundtrack.

Cast
 Kent Andersson - Kent
 Thommy Berggren - Actor
 Ben Carruthers - Benito (as Benito Carruthers)
 Agneta Ekmanner - Actress
 Björn Gustafson - Björn
 Ann-Marie Gyllenspetz - Ann-Marie
 Keve Hjelm - Keve
 Eva-Britt Strandberg - Eva-Britt

References

External links

1965 films
1960s Swedish-language films
1965 drama films
Swedish black-and-white films
Films directed by Bo Widerberg
1960s Swedish films